Brian Osborne (26 March 1940 – 8 July 2021) was an English actor. He was best known for his roles in Upstairs, Downstairs and The Sandbaggers. Osborne also had minor roles in six Carry On films as well the TV series Carry On Laughing.

Early life
Brian Osborne was born in 1940 in Bath, Somerset. He started acting while at school. Later he toured school with a children's theatre company and he played The Pied Piper of Hamelin. His first television role was in 1966 in an episode of Softly, Softly. After this he toured Europe and the United States with the Royal Shakespeare Company, as well as having roles in Bless This House and Follyfoot.

1970s and 1980s
In 1971, Brian Osborne secured the role of Pearce, the coachman, in the period drama Upstairs, Downstairs. This role did not play a large part in the programme and Pearce left Eaton Place in the programme's second series in 1972. In the same year, Osborne was in Carry On Matron. This was the first of six Carry On appearances, the others being Carry On Abroad, Carry On Girls, Carry On Dick, Carry On Behind and Carry On England. In addition, he appeared in seven episodes of the TV series Carry On Laughing. In 1973, he appeared in an episode of Some Mothers Do 'Ave 'Em and in 1976 appeared in an episode of Space: 1999. From 1978 to 1980 he played Sam Lawes in six episodes of Cold War drama The Sandbaggers.

In the 1980s, Osborne had many minor roles on television, including in Tales of the Unexpected, Minder (as Joe Harrison, episode Get Daley!, 1983), Shine on Harvey Moon, The Bill, Sorry!, Juliet Bravo, Casualty and Lord Peter Wimsey. His other film roles included Under Milk Wood (1971), Bless This House (1972), Nighthawks (1981), Haunters of the Deep (1984) and Last Orders (2001).

Personal life
Osborne relocated to Gran Canaria in 2020 to be with family. He died there in July 2021 at the age of 81.

Filmography

References

External links

1940 births
2021 deaths
English male film actors
English male stage actors
English male television actors
People from Bath, Somerset